Valley View School District may refer to a school district in the United States:

Valley View School District (Arkansas)
Valley View School District (Illinois)
Valley View School District (Pennsylvania)